Transwest Airlines was a commuter airline operating from its base in Jandakot Airport, Western Australia since 1979 until 1982 when it was amalgamated into Skywest Airlines (Australia).

History
The airline had its beginning in Carnarvon, Western Australia, where it operated as Trans-West Air Charter since 1967 employing Beech Baron and Cessna 206, focusing the activity on air charter services from Jandakot Airport, Geraldton, Port Hedland and Kalgoorlie.

When it amalgamated into Skywest Airlines in 1982 it was the largest commuter airline in Western Australia operating a range of aircraft as Beech Baron, Beech King Air, BN-2 Islander, Cessna 206, Cessna 210, Cessna 310, Cessna 404, DHC-6 Twin Otter and employing 28 pilots operating out of 6 regional bases in Western Australia.

Destinations
Goldsworthy
Kalgoorlie
Leonora
Marble Bar
Nullagine
Perth
Port Hedland
Tiaverton
Windarra

See also
 List of defunct airlines of Australia
 Aviation in Australia

References

Defunct airlines of Australia
1979 establishments in Australia
1981 disestablishments in Australia